Mansur Rejepov (born 3 January 1982 in Daşoguz) is a Turkmen weightlifter competing in the 85 kg category. He competed at the 2012 Summer Olympics.

References 

Turkmenistan male weightlifters
1982 births
Living people
Weightlifters at the 2012 Summer Olympics
Olympic weightlifters of Turkmenistan
Weightlifters at the 2006 Asian Games
Weightlifters at the 2010 Asian Games
Asian Games competitors for Turkmenistan
21st-century Turkmenistan people